The 55th Golden Bell Awards was held on September 26, 2020 at the Sun Yat-sen Memorial Hall in Taipei, Taiwan. The ceremony was televised by Sanlih E-Television and Public Television Service; it was jointly hosted by Sabrina Pai, Gino Tsai, Tseng Wan-ting, Chen Guan-lin, Lulu Huang Lu Zi Yin, Crowd Lu, Sam Tseng and Aaron Yan.

Winners and nominees
Below is the list of winners and nominees for the main categories.

References

External links
 Official website of the 55th Golden Bell Awards

2020
2020 television awards
2020 in Taiwan